Robert Jules Guédiguian (born 3 December 1953) is a French film director, screenwriter, producer and actor. Most of his films star Ariane Ascaride and Jean-Pierre Darroussin.

Life and career
Guédiguian is the son of a German mother and an Armenian father, whose family immigrated to France in the early 20th century after the Armenian genocide. He evokes his paternal roots in his 2006 film Le Voyage en Armenie. He has a working-class background, as his father is a worker on the Marseille docks. Guédiguian became concerned with political questions and for a while was involved with the French Communist Party. In 2008 he joined the Left Party in France.

Like Marcel Pagnol and René Allio before him, he anchors his films in social reality. His films are strongly marked by the local and regional environment of the city of Marseille, and in particular L'Estaque (north-west Marseille), for example in Marius et Jeannette. His 2011 film The Snows of Kilimanjaro premiered in the Un Certain Regard section at the 2011 Cannes Film Festival.

He has been married to actress Ariane Ascaride since 1975 and they have two daughters, Valentine and Madeleine.

Filmography

As filmmaker

As actor
1990: L'Ami Giono: Jofroi de la Maussan (Telefilm) 
2002: Lulu as Marius
2012: Rendezvous in Kiruna
2021: Twist à Bamako

References

External links 

 
  Les gens du cinéma

1953 births
Living people
Mass media people from Marseille
French people of Armenian descent
French people of German descent
French film directors
French male screenwriters
French screenwriters
Left Party (France) politicians
European Film Awards winners (people)
Officers of the Ordre national du Mérite
French film producers